Francisco Gómez de Sandoval y Rojas, 1st Duke of Lerma, 5th Marquess of Denia, 1st Count of Ampudia (1552/1553 – 17 May 1625), was a favourite of Philip III of Spain, the first of the validos ('most worthy') through whom the later Habsburg monarchs ruled. He was succeeded by the Count-Duke of Olivares.

Biography

The family of Sandoval was ancient and powerful. Lerma was born and raised at Tordesillas. As long as Philip II lived, the nobles had little effective share in the government, with the exception of a few who were appointed viceroys or commanded armies abroad. The future duke of Lerma passed his time as a courtier, and made himself a favourite with the young prince Philip, heir to the Spanish throne. The dying king Philip II foresaw that Lerma was one of those nobles who were likely to mislead the new sovereign. The old king's fears were, it is claimed by some, fully justified after his death. Others however, claim that Lerma was a fully capable favourite, as he led Castile and the Habsburg dominions on a more modest and economically viable course of peace than both Phillip II and Olivares during the reign of Phillip IV – both figures that have received far more positive recognition by historians.

No sooner was Philip III king than he entrusted all authority to his favourite, who amassed power unprecedented for a privado or favorite and became the "king's shadow", the filter through whom all information passed, as he was appointed Sumiller de Corps and Caballerizo mayor to the King. Philip III, preoccupied with piety and indolence, soon created him Duke of Lerma (1599), pressured the papacy to form for his uncle Bernardo a Cardinalship and delegated to him governorship of certain public offices and management responsibility of particular lands, authorized by the King and Queen, of the Roman Catholic Christian Kingdoms of Castile and Aragon.

Gifts poured in from outside the royal court. From the Medici in Florence in 1601 came an over-lifesize marble of Samson and a Philistine by Giovanni da Bologna, presented as a diplomatic gift. It had been made for a Medici garden, and though it had recently been in storage, it was a princely gift (now in the Victoria and Albert Museum, London). Lerma assembled a vast collection of paintings. Duke Mario Farnese sent over a Fra Angelico Annunciation (it was a little old-fashioned), which Lerma passed on to the Dominicans of Valladolid and is now at the Prado, Madrid.

As chief minister Lerma's ideas of foreign policy were firmly grounded in feudal ideas about royal patrimony. He cemented Spanish rule by many marriage alliances with the Austrian Habsburgs and then with the French Bourbons. Lerma's administration began with a treaty with France, the Treaty of Vervins in 1598, declaring peace, but he persisted in costly and useless hostilities with England till 1604, when Spain was forced by exhaustion to make peace. Lerma used all his influence against a recognition of the independence of the Low Countries.

Though in 1607 the monarchy declared itself bankrupt, Lerma carried out the ruinous measures for the expulsion of the Moriscos, Moors who had converted to Christianity, from 1609–14, a decision affecting over 300,000 people. A policy motivated by religious and political considerations, in which no economic consideration played a part, the expulsion secured him the admiration of the clergy and was popular with the masses of people. It also provided a short-term boost to the royal treasury from the impounded property of the Moors, but would ruin the economy of Valencia for generations.  Lerma's financial horizons remained medieval: his only resources as a finance minister were the debasing of the coinage and edicts against luxury and the making of silver plate.

Bankrupt or not, the war with the Dutch dragged on till 1609, when the Twelve Years' Truce was signed with them. There was constant anti-Spanish agitation in Portugal, which had been dynastically joined to Spain since 1580.

In the end, Lerma was deposed by a palace intrigue carried out by his own son, Cristóbal de Sandoval, Duke of Uceda, manipulated by Olivares. It is probable that he would never have lost the confidence of Philip III, who divided his life between festivals and prayers, if not for the domestic treachery of his son, who allied himself with the king's confessor, Aliaga, whom Lerma had introduced. After a long intrigue in which the king remained silent and passive, Lerma was at last compelled to leave the court, on 4 October 1618.

As a protection, and as a means of retaining some measure of power in case he fell from favour, he had persuaded Pope Paul V to create him cardinal, the previous March, 1618. He retired to his palace in Lerma, and then to Valladolid, where it was reported that he celebrated Mass every day "with great devotion and tears". When the dying Philip III was presented with a list of prisoners and exiles to be forgiven, he granted grace to all except the cardinal-duke of Lerma. When Lerma learned the news, he started from Valladolid to Madrid but was intercepted on the road and commanded by Olivares, favorite of the heir to the throne, who professed an implacable hatred for the cardinal, to return to Valladolid. The cardinal was in Villacastin and remained there until he learned of the death of the king. Then he went back to Valladolid to celebrate the requiem in the church of San Pablo. He was ordered by the count of Olivares to reside in Tordesillas but he did not obey and appealed to the pope. Gregory XV and the Sacred College defended him, considering his banishment an attempt against ecclesiastical freedom and the prestige of the cardinalate.

Under the reign of Philip IV, which began in 1621, Lerma was despoiled of part of his wealth. The cardinal was sentenced, on August 3, 1624, to return to the state over a million ducates. Lerma died in 1625 at Valladolid.

Marriage and issue
The Duke of Lerma married in 1576 with Catalina de la Cerda (1551-1603), daughter of Juan de la Cerda, 4th Duke of Medinaceli.
They had 5 children :
 Cristóbal de Sandoval, Duke of Uceda (1577 - 1624), his successor.
 Diego de Sandoval (died 1632), married Luisa de Mendoza, VII Condesa de Saldaña.
 Juana de Sandoval (died 1624), married Manuel Pérez de Guzmán y Silva, 8th Duke of Medina Sidonia.
 Catalina de Sandoval (died 1648), married Pedro Fernández de Castro, 7th Count of Lemos
 Francisca de Sandoval (died 1663), married Diego López de Zúñiga Avellaneda, 2nd Duke of Peñaranda de Duero.

Domestic policy
When Lerma fell from power in 1618, his status as cardinal (which he had acquired for exactly this purpose 6 months earlier) gave him immunity from prosecution by his numerous enemies, who instead turned on Lerma's trusted and unscrupulous secretary, Rodrigo Calderón (d. 1621), who as Lerma's agent was made a scapegoat. Calderón was tortured and executed on trumped up charges of witchcraft and other crimes, which demonstrated what would likely have been Lerma's fate, if a cardinal's hat hadn't protected his head.

Lerma was also responsible for the appointment of Don Pedro Franqueza to reform royal finances, but who instead managed to embezzle enough funds to purchase the title of Count of Villalonga. He was placed on trial and forfeited his riches.

At a time when the state was practically bankrupt, he encouraged the king in extravagance, and accumulated for himself a fortune estimated by contemporaries at forty-four million ducats.

On the hilltop overlooking the village of Lerma in Old Castile that provided his grand title, the duke built a palace (1606–1617, by Francisco de Mora) capped with corner towers, on the site of a fortification, ranged round a double-arcaded courtyard facing an arcaded square and linked to the rebuilt church of San Pedro with a private passageway. Lerma was pious, spending lavishly on religious houses.

In fiction

In the picaresque novel Gil Blas (chapter iv), the hero ingratiates himself with the count Olivarez, his new patron:

"Well! Santillane, said he, are you satisfied with your rooms, and with my orders to Don Raymond? Your excellency's liberality, answered I, seems out of all proportion with its object; so that I receive it with fear and trembling. Why so? replied he. Can I be too lavish of distinction to a man whom the king has committed to my care, and for whose interests he especially commanded me to provide? No, that is impossible; and I do no more than my duty in placing you on a footing of respectability and consequence. No longer, therefore, let what I do for you he a subject of surprise; but rely on it that splendour in the eye of the world, and the solid advantages of accumulating wealth, are equally with in your grasp, if you do but attach yourself as faithfully to me as you did to the Duke of Lerma.

But now that we are on the subject of that nobleman, continued he, it is said that you lived on terms of personal intimacy with him. I have a strong curiosity to lean the circumstances which led to your first acquaintance, as well as in what department you acted under him. Do not disguise or gloss over the slightest particular, for I shall not be satisfied without a full, true, and circumstantial recital. Then it was that I recollected in what an embarrassing predicament I stood with the Duke of Lerma on a similar occasion, and by what line of conduct I extricated myself; that same course I adopted once again with the happiest success; whereby the reader is to understand that throughout my narrative I softened down the passages likely to give umbrage to my patron, and glanced with a superficial delicacy over transactions which would have reflected but little lustre on my own character. I likewise manifested a considerate tenderness for the Duke of Lerma; though by giving that fallen favourite no quarter, I should better have consulted the taste of him whom I wished to please."

Gil Blas ruminates upon the cardinal's hat that Paul V gave the Duke of Lerma: "This pope, wishing to establish the inquisition in the kingdom of Naples, invested the minister with the purple, and by that means hoped to bring King Philip over to so pious and praiseworthy a design. Those who were best acquainted with this new member of the sacred college, thought much like myself, that the church was in a fair way for apostolical purity, after so spiritual an acquisition."

Young Mikhail Lermontov associated his surname with Lerma's title, which is an obvious fiction; even the family legend traced back the name to Thomas Learmonth the Rhymer from Scotland, but not to Lerma. The poet painted an imaginary portrait of the "Duke of Lerma" and created some other works featuring Spaniards.

Anachronistically, a "Duke of Lerma" features as one of the minor characters in the opera Don Carlos by Giuseppe Verdi.

See also
Lerma, Burgos
The Great Favourite

References

Bibliography
 Antonio Feros, Kingship and Favoritism in the Spain of Philip III, 1598–1621 (Cambridge Studies in Early Modern History), New York: Cambridge U. Press. 2000.
 Patrick Williams, The great favourite: The Duke of Lerma and the court and government of Philip III of Spain, 1598-1621. Manchester and New York: Manchester University Press, 2006.
 Sarah Schroth, The Picture Collection of the Duke of Lerma, 2002.
 The history of Lerma's tenure of office is in vol. xv. of the Historia General de Espana of Modesto Lafuente (Madrid, 1855)—with references to contemporary authorities.
 Lisa A. Banner, The Religious Patronage of the Duke of Lerma, 1598-1621, Ashgate, 2009. Discusses his patronage of churches, paintings, architects and painters.

External links

Biographical dictionary of the Cardinals of the Holy Roman Church; illuminating backstory on the cardinalate.
The Equestrian Portrait of the Duke of Lerma by Peter Paul Rubens, (1603) Prado, Madrid.
The Duke of Lerma, Part I in a podcast series for the exhibition, "El Greco to Velazquez: Art during the Reign of Philip III"

Lerma, Duke of
Lerma, Duke of
Lerma, Duke of
Spanish royal favourites
101
Spanish Baroque people
16th-century Spanish nobility
17th-century Spanish nobility